Consumed is the fourth studio album by Canadian electronic music producer Richie Hawtin, and his third studio album under the alias Plastikman. It was released in 1998 by Minus and Novamute Records, with the 11:40 minute title track widely considered both the album's peak and one of Hawtin's best works.

Critical reception

The New York Times wrote: "The thumps and the pinglike sound of searching radar create a mood in Consumed that is oceanic and hypnotic yet hardly New Age: the tension is too thick."

In a retrospective article, The A.V. Club called the album "a career highlight that stripped techno to a glacial pulse and the barren sounds of a boundless alien wasteland." In 2018, Pitchfork placed Consumed at number 34 on its list of the 50 best albums of 1998.

Track listing

Personnel
Credits adapted from liner notes.
 Richie Hawtin – music, artwork concept, design
 Nilz – mastering
 Matthew Hawtin – artwork concept, design
 Ja – artwork
 Seth – artwork concept, design

Charts

Consumed In Key

In April 2022, Hawtin and the pianist Chilly Gonzales released the album Consumed in Key, a reinterpretation of Consumed.

References

External links
 Consumed, Richie Hawtin official YouTube channel

1998 albums
Richie Hawtin albums
Novamute Records albums